DOT Europe (formerly EDiMA) is an organisation that brings together the main internet companies in Europe. the organisation was founded in 2000 and currently has 22 members which include: Apple, Google, Facebook, TikTok, and Spotify.

References 

Information technology lobbying organizations
Information technology organizations based in Europe
Business organizations based in Europe
Lobbying organizations in Europe